The 1880 United States presidential election in Delaware took place on November 2, 1880, as part of the 1880 United States presidential election. State voters chose three representatives, or electors, to the Electoral College, who voted for president and vice president.

Delaware was won by General Winfield Scott Hancock (D–Pennsylvania), running with former Representative William Hayden English, with 51.53% of the popular vote, against Representative James A. Garfield (R-Ohio), running with the 10th chairman of the New York State Republican Executive Committee Chester A. Arthur, with 48.03% of the vote.

Results

See also
 United States presidential elections in Delaware

References

Delaware
1880
1880 Delaware elections